A Bugged Out Mix is the third DJ mix album by French recording artist Miss Kittin released in the United Kingdom on April 17, 2006. A number of electronic music recording artists were featured on the album, including fellow electroclash musician Princess Superstar, Squarepusher, and Saint Etienne.

Critical reception 

The album received generally favorable reviews. Stephanie Kale from Exclaim noted, "The range of what Miss Kittin mixes truly reveals her talent for bringing disparate styles and rhythms together in a way that makes sense." Likewise, Scott Colothan from Gigwise.com said that "the main strength in this album is its sheer unpredictability and refusal to adhere to the build-up/release formula inherent to many live sets."

Track listing

Disc One: Perfect Night

Disc Two: Perfect Day

Personnel 
 Artwork (Cover Design) – Bente Schipp
 DJ Mix – Miss Kittin
 Mastering – Craig Dormer, Richard Tugwell

Source:

Charts

References 

Miss Kittin albums
2006 compilation albums
Rough Trade Records compilation albums